Eudamidas may refer to:

 Eudamidas I (330 – c. 300 BC), king of Sparta 
 Eudamidas II, king of Sparta (ruled c. 275 BC – c. 244 BC)
 Eudamidas III, king of Sparta from 241 to 228 BC